Hubberts Bridge is a village in the borough of Boston, Lincolnshire, England.
 
The village name derives from the bridge crossing the South Forty-Foot Drain. Originally it was a wooden structure, thought to have been owned by Robert Hubbert, born on the 2 March in Lincolnshire and died in 1850 in Boston, Lincolnshire. A new wooden bridge was erected about 1850, but was replaced again by a brick structure in 1888 by the county justices for the Parts of Holland from designs of John Kingston, county surveyor.

The village is served by Hubberts Bridge railway station, and has a local public house, the Wheatsheaf Inn, and a community centre.

References

External links

Villages in Lincolnshire
Borough of Boston